The Test for Echo Tour was a concert tour by Canadian rock band Rush in support of their sixteenth studio album Test for Echo.

Background
It was the band's first tour with no opening act, and was billed as "An Evening With Rush". The tour kicked off on October 19, 1996 at the Knickerbocker Arena in Albany, New York and culminated on July 4, 1997 at the Corel Centre in Ottawa, Ontario. This was the only concert tour in which Rush played the song "2112" in its entirety. During the tour, the band had included live camera footage, video, lasers and strobes as part of their sets. This marked the last tour until 2002 because of tragedies in Neil Peart's life. Recordings from the tour were released on the 1998 live album Different Stages.

Reception
On the opening night of the tour in Albany's Knickerbocker Arena, Michael Lisi from The Sunday Gazette wrote that the band had shown that practice makes perfect, when the band performed with a visual and aural attack which kept the audience on its feet and screaming the whole show, with other fans waving their hands during the performance of "2112" in its entirety, noting on the words of a fan after the band left the stage that it was "unbelievable". Lisi continued on the mix of old and new songs which he stated was superb, noting the new songs as "right on the mark". He stated that the band were able to breathe life into "Closer to the Heart" which was noted as a "powerful read". Commenting on the band, Lisi stated that they looked like they were having a blast, were right on the money when commenting positively on Lee's vocals being in perfect form, and that they sounded better than ever.

Reviewing the Civic Arena performance in Pittsburgh on November 3, 1996, Kathy Sabol from the Observer-Reporter, stated that she had enjoyed the concert, noting on the melodic songs along the video backdrop in which she appreciated drummer Neil Peart's statements on greed, ambition, death and despair. Regarding the change in the band's sound, she said that it was no accident that it came from Rush's efforts in the last five years when the band evolved to a richer, clarified sound of its own. Other than taking note on how "2112" performed in its entirety is a big deal, she stated that the sampling, and multi-layering of the guitar and drum work is a credit to the band's history with how they manage.

The Deseret Newss Scott Iwasald, reviewing the May 20, 1997 show at Salt Lake City's Delta Center, opened that the band did not need elaborate stage props, stage sets or costumes unlike modern bands those days, in which the music spoke for itself. He wrote that the band were as hot as ever, playing well, tight and looked like they were having fun on stage - working together to put on a terrific live show. He noted when the video backdrop was not working during the first half of the evening, but said the band did not need it, as he stated before that the music spoke for itself. Regarding the audience, he wrote that the instrumental "Limbo" and the power chorus of "Force Ten" brought them to their feet, later concluding that the band held them in their palm, and when the show ended, none of the audience were disappointed.

Set list
This is an example setlist adapted from Rush: Wandering the Face of the Earth – The Official Touring History of what were performed during the tour, but may not represent the majority of the shows.

Set 1
"Dreamline"
"Limelight"
"Stick It Out"
"The Big Money" (with "Wipeout" outro)
"Driven"
"Half the World"
"Red Barchetta"
"Animate"
"Limbo"
"The Trees"
"Red Sector A"
"Virtuality"
"Nobody's Hero"
"Closer to the Heart"
"2112" (all chapters)

Set 2
"Test for Echo"
"Subdivisions"
"Freewill"
"Roll the Bones"
"Resist"
"Leave That Thing Alone"
"The Rhythm Method" (drum solo)
"Natural Science"
"Force Ten"
"Time and Motion"
"The Spirit of Radio"
"Tom Sawyer"

Encore
"YYZ"
"Cygnus X-1" (teaser)

Tour dates

Box office score data

Personnel
 Geddy Lee – vocals, bass, keyboards
 Alex Lifeson – guitar, backing vocals
 Neil Peart – drums

References

Citations

Sources
 
 
 
 
 

Rush (band) concert tours
1996 concert tours
1997 concert tours
Concert tours of North America
Concert tours of the United States
Concert tours of Canada